Garry English (7 January 1935 – 17 February 2007) was  a former Australian rules footballer who played with North Melbourne in the Victorian Football League (VFL).

Notes

External links 
		

1935 births
2007 deaths
Australian rules footballers from Victoria (Australia)
North Melbourne Football Club players